Colebrook is a rural locality and town in the local government area of Southern Midlands in the Central region of Tasmania. The 2016 census determined a population of 294 for the state suburb of Colebrook.

History
Colebrook is a confirmed suburb/locality. After being known by several names it was officially named Colebrook in 1894.

Geography
Almost all boundaries are survey lines. The Main railway line passes through via the town from north to south-east.

Road infrastructure
The B31 route (Mud Walls Road / Colebrook Road) enters from the north-west and runs through via the town to the south-east, where it exits. Route C313 (Rhyndaston Road) starts at an intersection with B31 and runs north until it exits. Route C316 (Lovely Banks Road) starts at an intersection with B31 and runs north-west until it exits. Route C342 (Eldon Road) starts at an intersection with C313 and runs north-east until it exits.

References

Localities of Southern Midlands Council
Towns in Tasmania